Mount Kawi or Gunung Kawi is a stratovolcano in East Java on Java island, Indonesia. It is a massive volcano, adjacent to Mount Butak. There is no historical record of its eruptions.

See also 

 List of volcanoes in Indonesia

References 

Kawi
Kawi
Kawi
Holocene stratovolcanoes